The Mundart des Kürzungsgebiets is a subdialect of Low Prussian, part of Low German, spoken in today's Poland. 
In 1918, it was spoken in East Prussia and West Prussia in their respective then borders. Mundart des Kürzungsgebiets was spoken around Braniewo and Frombork and had a border to  
Natangian, Westkäslausch, Mundart der Elbinger Höhe and Oberländisch.

 There was influence of Salzburgers.
 The Western border to Elbląg Upland was a border of denominations. 

Part of its Southern border was undetermined by political or religious borders.
 Long e before p, t and k is shortened to short i, long o before t and k is shortened to u.

Between Plasswich and Borchertsdorf, its only border to High Prussian ran.

Shortening of û to u before velars occurred in part of its area.

Notes 

Low German
Languages of Poland
Low Prussian dialect